Salibacterium halotolerans is a bacterium from the genus of Salibacterium.

References

 

Bacillaceae
Bacteria described in 2015